Kronan is a residential area in Luleå, Sweden. It had 597 inhabitants in 2010.

References

External links
Kronan at Luleå Municipality

Luleå